The Suicide Six was a British comics series drawn by Brian Lewis between 1962 and 1963. It was published in comics magazine Tiger, debuting with issue #13 [362] (January 1962).

Concept
The Suicide Six was a war comic set during World War II, and described the fantastic exploits of a (fictional) six-person squad of Allied troops from various British Empire nations fighting in North Africa.

Characters
 Captain Dan "Rocky" Rock, from England
 Sergeant Rafferty
 "Sapper" Gunn, a cockney formerly of the Royal Engineers
 "Bluey" Doyle, an Australian and a crack shot with a Lee–Enfield rifle
 Dave Lawson
 "Sparks" Grant

References

British comics
Fleetway and IPC Comics
1962 comics debuts
1963 comics endings
Comics set during World War II
Fictional British military personnel
British comics characters